Thymus capitatus is a compact, woody perennial  native to Mediterranean Europe and Turkey, more commonly known as conehead thyme, Persian-hyssop and Spanish oregano. It is also known under the name Thymbra capitata.

Description

The pink, -long flowers are held in cone-shaped clusters at the ends of their stems in mid to late summer; they are protected by overlapping, -long, red-tinged bracts, edged in tiny hairs.

In Eurasia, a species of leafless parasitic dodder (Cuscuta epithymum) would often attach itself to the conehead thyme (Thymus capitatus), taking on the plant's pungency and from whence it also derived its host's Arabic name, al-ṣaʿitrah.

Thymus capitatus is hardy from USDA Zones 7–10. In Israel, the plant Thymus capitatus has protected status, making it a criminal offence to harvest it.

See also
Satureja thymbra

References

capitatus
Flora of Italy
Flora of Spain
Flora of Turkey
Herbs
Flora of Israel
Flora of Palestine (region)
Flora of the Mediterranean Basin